Andreas Heier (born 5 December 1993) is a Norwegian ice hockey player for Stjernen Hockey and the Norwegian national team.

He represented Norway at the 2021 IIHF World Championship.

References

External links

1993 births
Living people
IK Pantern players
Modo Hockey players
Norwegian expatriate ice hockey people
Norwegian expatriate sportspeople in Sweden
Norwegian ice hockey left wingers
Norwegian ice hockey right wingers
Sportspeople from Fredrikstad
Stjernen Hockey players
Vålerenga Ishockey players